The Special Tactics Group (STG) is the full-time police tactical group of the New Zealand Police. The STG, originally named the Anti-Terrorist Squad, was established to respond to high-risk situations which are beyond the scope or capacity of everyday policing. STG officers directly support operational police in incidents, such as sieges, with specialist tactical, negotiation, intelligence, and command support services.

Officers are assigned to the STG on a full-time basis with sections based in Auckland, Wellington and Christchurch. In 2012, the STG became a police tactical group following the New Zealand government joining Australia’s national counter-terrorism coordination organisation.

History
In 1977, the New Zealand Police formed the Anti-Terrorist Squad (ATS) a part-time national unit to respond to terrorist incidents. Training commenced in July 1977 for selected members of the Armed Offenders Squad (AOS). A section of the ATS was based in Wellington with smaller sections based in Auckland and Christchurch. Commissioner of Police John Jamieson sent the group in response to the Aramoana massacre in 1990. They located gunman David Gray and ended his spree. Group member Stephen Vaughan was shot in the ankle during the final shoot-out.

In 1991, the ATS was renamed the Special Tactics Group. The STG was tasked with additional roles. On 1 July 2003, the STG became a full-time group due to changes made by the New Zealand Police in response to worldwide terrorism-related events. In May 2009, the STG was involved in the Napier shootings alongside their colleagues in the Armed Offenders Squad. In March 2019, the STG responded to a terrorist attack at two mosques in Christchurch providing specialist first aid to the victims. The STG was coincidentally at a sniping course with international police in Christchurch and armed operators from Australian police tactical groups also responded to the attack at the Al Noor mosque. In September 2021, two STG operators fatally shot a "ISIS-inspired" terrorist following a stabbing attack at a Countdown supermarket in Auckland.

Role

The STG deals with armed incidents that are beyond the capability of the part-time Armed Offenders Squad, of which they are also members. While the Armed Offenders Squad is trained to cordon or contain high risk situations such as sieges, the Special Tactics Group is trained to resolve them. The group also provides specialist protection to high risk persons and VIPs. The STG is supported during its operations by the Armed Offenders Squad, Police Negotiation Teams and canine units trained for use in situations involving firearms.

The group is known to train with New Zealand Special Air Service of which little public information is released as well as with Australian police tactical groups.

The STG has provided specialist armed officers for overseas operations such as the Regional Assistance Mission to the Solomon Islands (RAMSI), working alongside officers from the Australian Federal Police. The STG has deployed to Australia to assist Australian police tactical groups with security at major events including the 2007 APEC meeting in Sydney and the 2014 G20 summit in Brisbane. STG have been part of all major security operations in New Zealand including the 1990 Commonwealth Games, the Commonwealth Heads of Government Meeting 1995, APEC meetings, royal and VIP tours. In 2012, the New Zealand Government entered into Australia's National Counter-Terrorism arrangement forming a co-operation partnership between the countries with the committee that oversees the agreement renamed to the Australia-New Zealand Counter-Terrorism Committee.

The STG works closely with No. 3 Squadron of the Royal New Zealand Air Force utilising their NH-90 helicopters for both training and operations including with fast roping. The New Zealand Police Air Support Unit also provides the STG with support with their Bell 429 GlobalRanger helicopters.

Principal roles
 Protecting endangered witnesses
 Resolving siege and hostage situations, as well as with AOS.
 Undertaking searches of premises in high-risk situations
 Collecting tactical information on criminal activities
 The arrest of armed and dangerous offenders
 Escorting and securing dangerous prisoners in high-risk situations
 Providing support services for major operations
 Escorting and protecting VIPs and other at-risk or important persons

The STG also provides specialist assistance in performing tasks that are beyond the scope of operational police. Some of these tasks may require specialist equipment or expertise in certain areas.

In 2017–18, the STG "were deployed 84 times".

Requirements
Positions are open to current or past members of the Armed Offenders Squad. Officers must successfully complete the STG four-day selection course and three-week qualification course to gain selection to the unit. In 2007, the first woman passed the selection course.

Equipment 
In keeping with the weapons available to front-line officers, the STG are issued with the following equipment:
 Glock 17 pistol
 Bushmaster M4A3 carbine with multiple accessories installed such as Surefire Flashlights, Aimpoint and EOtech scopes, front grips, and slings
 Remington 870 shotgun
 HK MP5 submachine gun 
 HK69 40mm grenade launcher 
 Accuracy International AW sniper rifle 
 Ballistic vests
 Kevlar helmets
 Ballistic shields
 Drop-leg holsters and magazine pouches (optional to the officer)
For deployment of CS gas, the Remington 870 shotgun and HK69 grenade launcher can be used while the shotgun may also apply for breaching purposes. In 2013, the STG was issued with non-lethal 40mm XM1006 sponge rounds that are fired from the HK69 grenade launcher.

When responding to incidents, or executing planned operations, AOS officers utilise both standard marked and unmarked cars, and large four-wheel drive vehicles, such as the Nissan Patrol. These are fitted with running boards and roof rails, to allow officers to stand on the side while the vehicle is in motion, as well as having enclosed boxes on the roof for carrying equipment.

In 2009, two New Zealand Army LAV III light armour vehicles were utilised in response to the Napier shootings. The STG has since conducted training exercises with the LAV III. In 2019, the STG took delivery of three ASC armoured Toyota Land Cruisers.

See also
List of police tactical units

References

External links

1977 establishments in New Zealand
New Zealand Police
Police tactical units